The Mueller Tower is a historic  bell tower on the campus of the University of Nebraska–Lincoln in Lincoln, Nebraska. It was built in 1949, and it is named for alumnus Ralph S. Mueller.

History
The  tower was built with limestone from Indiana thanks to a $90,000 donation from alumnus Ralph S. Mueller, the founder and president of the Cleveland, Ohio-based Mueller Electric Company. It was designed by George Kuska Jr. when he was still a student at the university, and he later became a professional architect in central California. The construction of the tower was completed in 1949.

Its dedication was attended by 2,000 individuals on November 4, 1949. They included Chancellor R. G. Gustavson and President Harold S. Wilson as well as Professor Lynus Burr Smith, who was the head of the department of Architecture, and Arthur Lynds Bigelow, "one of the world's greatest carillonneurs." Other attendees included Deane Waldo Malott, then the president of the University of Kansas, George Kuska Jr., the architect, as well as Mr Mueller and members of his family.

The bell tower was cordoned off in 2006 as the limestone began collapsing, and the university lacked funding to restore it. By then, it had become "one of the most recognizable structures on campus," and university officials vowed to restore it shortly.

The tower does not include a traditional array of bells. Instead the tower has eight speakers which broadcast recordings or live music played. Mueller, whose career was in electronics, liked the electronic broadcast system idea. The music was initially played on a keyboard, but it was later replaced by tape recordings. As late as 1985, a student played the keyboard prior to football games in the octagonal room inside the tower. For the pre-recorded music, an Embassy Digital Autobell Carillon machine is now used. The tower has also been used to commemorate special occasions, like the 16th anniversary of the AIDS epidemic on December 4, 1996, three days after World AIDS Day. As of 2015, the system was broadcasting music selected randomly, at the hour and at 23 minutes past the hour.

References

External links
The Schulmerich Legacy

Towers completed in 1949
1949 establishments in Nebraska
University of Nebraska–Lincoln
Bell towers in the United States